Hugh McKay may refer to:

 Randy McKay (Hugh Randall McKay, born 1967), retired Canadian ice hockey player
 Hugh Victor McKay (1865–1926), Australian inventor and industrialist
 Hugh McKay (footballer) (1883–1971), Australian rules footballer

See also
 Hugh Mackay (disambiguation)